The 2021–22 Quinnipiac Bobcats men's basketball team represented Quinnipiac University in the 2021–22 NCAA Division I men's basketball season. The Bobcats, led by fifth-year head coach Baker Dunleavy, played their home games at People's United Center in Hamden, Connecticut as members of the Metro Atlantic Athletic Conference.

Previous season
In a season limited due to the ongoing COVID-19 pandemic, the Bobcats finished the 2020–21 season 9–13, 7–10 in MAAC play to finish in a tie for fifth place. As the No. 8 seed in the MAAC tournament, they lost in the first round to Iona.

Roster

Schedule and results
The Bobcats had their scheduled game against Penn State canceled due to positive COVID-19 tests at PSU.

|-
!colspan=12 style=""| Regular season

|-
!colspan=9 style=""| MAAC tournament

Sources

References

Quinnipiac Bobcats men's basketball seasons
Quinnipiac Bobcats
Quinnipiac Bobcats men's basketball
Quinnipiac Bobcats men's basketball